The 2008 Supercoppa Italiana was a football match that was played by 2007–08 Serie A winners Internazionale and 2007–08 Coppa Italia winners Roma. The match proved to be a tightly contested affair. After exchanging goals, it appeared that Inter was on its way to victory on Mario Balotelli's goal on the 83rd minute, however, Mirko Vučinić tied the game for Roma at the 90th minute. Extra time settled nothing.  In the penalty shoot-out, it appeared that a miss by Inter's Dejan Stanković would be decisive, however, Roma captain Francesco Totti missed the team's fifth shot, which would have given his team the cup. In the seventh round, Roma's Juan missed while Inter captain Javier Zanetti scored, ending the match in favour of the Serie A champions.

The match took place on 24 August 2008 in San Siro, Milan.

To date, this remains the only occasion on which manager José Mourinho won a trophy by a penalty shoot-out.

Match details

References

Supercoppa Italiana
Supercoppa 2008
Supercoppa 2008
Supercoppa Italiana 2008
2
August 2008 sports events in Europe